The Hubballi–Secunderabad Express is an Express train belonging to South Western Railway zone that runs between  and  in India. It is currently being operated with 17320/17319 train numbers on a daily basis.

Service

The 17319/Hubballi–Secunderabad Express has an average speed of 44 km/hr and covers 662 km in 14h 55m. The 17320/Secunderabad–Hubballi Express has an average speed of 42 km/hr and covers 662 km in 15h 50m.

Route and halts 

The important halts of the train are:

Coach composition

The train has standard ICF rakes with a max speed of 110 kmph. The train consists of 16 coaches:

 1 AC II Tier
 1 AC III Tier
 6 Sleeper coaches
 6 General Unreserved
 2 Seating cum Luggage Rake

Traction

Both trains are hauled by a Krishnarajapuram Loco Shed based WDM-3A or WDP-4B or WDG-4 or WDP-4D diesel locomotive from Hubballi to Secunderabad and vice versa.

Rake sharing 

The train shares its rake with 17317/17318 Hubballi–Lokmanya Tilak Terminus Express.

Direction reversal

The train reverses its direction 2 times:

See also 

 Hubli Junction railway station
 Secunderabad Junction railway station
 Hubballi–Lokmanya Tilak Terminus Express

Notes

References

External links 

 17319/Hubballi–Secunderabad Express India Rail Info
 17320/Secunderabad–Hubballi Express India Rail Info

Transport in Hubli-Dharwad
Transport in Secunderabad
Express trains in India
Rail transport in Karnataka
Rail transport in Telangana